Metanoia is the sixth studio album by Andorran metal band Persefone. It was released on 4 February 2022 by label Napalm Records. A music video for "Merkebah" was released alongside the album's announcement on 16 November 2021. The 11-minute instrumental "Consciousness (Pt.3)" continues the "Consciousness" suite from their 2013 album Spiritual Migration.

Track listing

Personnel 

Persefone

 Marc Martins: vocals
 Carlos Lozano: guitars
 Miguel Espinosa: keyboards, vocals
 Tony Mestre: bass
 Sergi Verdeguer: drums
 Filipe Baldaia: guitars

Guest musicians

 Einar Solberg (Leprous): vocals (track 1)
 Steffen Kummerer (Obscura): guitars (track 8 part 2)
 Angel Vivaldi: guitars (track 8 part 2)
 Merethe Soltvedt (Two Steps from Hell): vocals (tracks 5 and 8 part 2)

Production

 Mixed by David Castillo (Leprous, Soen, Opeth)
 Mastered by Tony Lindgren (Enslaved, Ihsahn, Sepultura)
 Artwork by Jon Ojibway

References 

2022 albums
Persefone albums